During the 2007–08 English football season, West Bromwich Albion competed in the Football League Championship. They finished the season in first place, thus earning promotion to the Premier League the following season.

Season summary
After the previous season's play-off final heartbreak, Tony Mowbray set about restructuring his squad, moving out several players for multimillion-pound fees after press reports of dressing room division. High-profile players such as Jason Koumas, Diomansy Kamara and Curtis Davies were sold to Premier League clubs for large fees, joining Paul McShane, Nathan Ellington, Darren Carter and Steve Watson in leaving the Hawthorns. Mowbray replaced them by signing a total of 14 permanent and loan players in the summer transfer window, making an overall profit in the process.

Despite the large changes in his squad, Mowbray won the Championship Manager of the Month award in September, after Albion gained 13 out of the maximum 15 points and climbed to second. At the start of 2008, Mowbray's young Albion team topped the table, receiving growing plaudits from the media and supporters alike for their attractive brand of attacking one touch passing football, a reflection of Mowbray's staunch footballing philosophy.

Mowbray guided Albion to the Football League Championship title and promotion to the Premier League, and also reached the FA Cup semi-final. The semi-final, the first to be played at the new Wembley Stadium, pitted Albion against Portsmouth, the only remaining Premier League team left in the FA Cup. Portsmouth won the match 1–0 with the only goal of the game coming from former Albion striker Nwankwo Kanu. Mowbray won the Championship manager of the month award for April, as well as the League Managers Association manager of the year award.

Kit
English company Umbro remained West Bromwich's kit manufacturers. T-Mobile remained the kit sponsors.

Final league table

Results
West Bromwich Albion's score comes first

Legend

Football League Championship

FA Cup

League Cup

Players

First-team squad
Squad at end of season

Left club during season

Transfers

Out
 Chris Perry – released (later joined Luton Town), 1 June 2007
 Diomansy Kamara – Fulham, £6,000,000, 9 July 2007
 Steve Watson – Sheffield Wednesday, free, 10 July 2007
Jason Koumas – Wigan Athletic, £5,300,000, 10 July 2007
 Paul McShane – Sunderland, £1,500,000, 26 July 2007
 Darren Carter – Preston North End, £750,000, 9 August 2007
 Nathan Ellington – Watford, £3,250,000, 29 August 2007
 Curtis Davies – Aston Villa, season loan, 31 August 2007

In
 Shelton Martis – Hibernian, £50,000, 2 July 2007.
 Craig Beattie – Celtic, £1,250,000, 3 July 2007
 Filipe Teixeira – Académica, £600,000, 17 July 2007
Leon Barnett – Luton Town, £2,500,000, 26 July 2007
 Tininho – Beira-Mar, £230,000, 31 July 2007
 Boštjan Cesar – Marseille, season loan, 7 August 2007
Carl Hoefkens – Stoke City, £750,000, 7 August 2007
James Morrison – Middlesbrough, £1,500,000, 7 August 2007
 Pelé – Southampton, £1,000,000, 9 August 2007
Chris Brunt – Sheffield Wednesday, £3,000,000, 15 August 2007
Ishmael Miller – Manchester City, loan, 15 August 2007(made permanent 31 January 2008 for £900,000)
 Bartosz Ślusarski – Dyskobolia Grodzisk
 Michal Daněk – Viktoria Plzeň, loan
 Roman Bednář – Hearts, loan

References

Notes

West Bromwich Albion F.C. seasons
West Bromwich Albion